Khrenishche is a rural locality (a khutor) in Nikolskoye Rural Settlement, Bobrovsky District, Voronezh Oblast, Russia. The population was 99 as of 2010.

Geography 
Khrenishche is located 20 km west of Bobrov (the district's administrative centre) by road. Sredny Ikorets is the nearest rural locality.

References 

Rural localities in Bobrovsky District